The Geographers' A–Z Street Atlas, commonly shortened to A–Z (pronounced "Ay to Zed"), is a title given to any one of a range of atlases of streets in the United Kingdom produced by Geographers' A–Z Map Company Limited. Its first atlas, of London, was originally compiled in the 1930s by Phyllis Pearsall. The company she founded now publishes street maps of many cities and towns in the UK.

Dating old maps

Until relatively recently, maps produced by the Geographers' (A–Z) Map Company did not include a publication date. It is possible to determine a date range for publication due to the following:
 their first map was published in 1936;
 the only maps produced by them during World War II (1939–1945) were war maps of Europe;
 until 1962, the "Published By" address was 24 Grays Inn Road, Holborn, London;
 from 1962 to 1992, the "Published By" address was Sevenoaks, Kent;
 from 1992 onwards, the "Published By" address is Borough Green, Kent;
 in 1972, the company name was changed from Geographers' Map Company to Geographers' A–Z Map Company.

Coded date
On all A–Z maps, there is a three or four letter code in one of the corners, often the one containing the key. These letters represent numbers, which are the cartographic date, in the form (M)MYY. There was at least one scheme used, and perhaps a second.

In one scheme, the letters JIHGFEDCBA represent the digits 1 to 9 and 0, so that HFD would be 357, indicating a publication date of March 1957. This seems to have been used on all the company's folding maps, and possibly also those in book form.

Media appearance
The Geographers' A–Z Street Atlas and the story of how Phyllis Pearsall came to write the first edition covering London were featured in a 2005 episode of Nicholas Crane's Map Man TV programme. This revealed that, on all their maps, A–Z print a non-existent trap street so that they can tell if a map has been illegally copied from theirs, a technique used by several publishers of reference works (see fictitious entry).

The story of Pearsall's development of the A–Z also inspired the  musical The A–Z of Mrs P.

The London A–Z is a plot device in "The Blind Banker", the second episode of the first series of the BBC drama Sherlock when the protagonist is attempting to decipher a book code used by an international smuggling ring based on a book "everybody owns". After attempting to decipher the code using a dictionary and the Bible, Sherlock goes out into Baker Street and appropriates a copy of the A–Z after seeing it being used by a couple of tourists.

2012 Olympics
Geographers' A–Z Map Company was the official supplier of atlases and maps for the 2012 Olympic Games and 2012 Paralympic Games and produced detailed maps for the Olympic Park in Stratford, as well as all the other venues that were used during the games in London and throughout the United Kingdom. They produced three special maps detailing transport information on getting to the venues and also provided information on events related to the 2012 Cultural Olympiad. In addition, A–Z provided special sections relating to the Games in their 2012 editions of their main UK-wide and local maps.

See also
The A–Z of Mrs P
 Geographers' A–Z Map Company

External links

Phyllis Pearsall: founder of Geographers' A–Z Map Company

Sources
 Dating old maps 
 Dating old maps
 Key company dates

Atlases
Publications established in 1936
Maps of the United Kingdom
Maps of London
1936 establishments in England